Gietrzwałd (() is a village in northeastern Poland located in Warmia, in the Warmian-Masurian Voivodeship, near Olsztyn. Gietrzwałd is the capital of Gmina Gietrzwałd. Gietrzwałd is a popular Roman Catholic pilgrimage destination.

Natural geography

The area where Gietrzwałd is located has specific features caused by a glacier. As a result, the region has varied terrain and great richness and diversity of nature. The most important natural values of the region are its lakes and rivers. The Giławka River, which Gietrzwałd is situated upon, is a right tributary of the Pasłęka River.

History

Gietrzwałd was founded in 1352 within the Archdiocese of Warmia, then within the dominions of the Teutonic Order, by one Dietrich or Ditter, who named it Dietrichswald.
In the 15th century, Gietrzwałd was destroyed during the Thirteen Years' War between Poland and the Teutonic Knights. The village was invaded by the Teutonic army under the command of Georg von Schlieben.
In the middle of the 16th century, the settlement was not developing, although there was a school and an inn (Jerzy Kunig had been the owner of the inn since 1645). In 1772 the village was annexed by the Kingdom of Prussia in the First Partition of Poland, and subsequently the local Polish population was subjected to Germanisation. In 1783, there were 57 houses in Gietrzwałd. In 1807, the village was attacked and plundered by the French army in the Napoleonic wars.

Marian Apparitions

In the year 1877, according to the Catholics, the Virgin Mary was revealed to two people, little girls Stanisława Samulowska and Justyna Szafryńska. She appeared several times, speaking the Polish language (as opposed to German;  in East Prussia German was the main language and there was a Polish minority), and explained how important it is to pray and say the rosary.
Since then, pilgrims from Poland and other countries, have been coming to Gietrzwałd to see the picture of the Virgin Mary and a spring with claimed miraculous powers. The Catholic Church acknowledged the Vision of the Mother of Christ as real in 1977. The town is now an official pilgrim area.

Culture

There is a Communal Cultural Centre in Gietrzwałd. It is open all year. People can find tourist information there and buy handcrafts in a gallery.
The Centre is the initiator and organizer of various events, which take place in the province.  Furthermore, it is responsible for taking actions in social and cultural animation, education and art workshops for children and adults.

Religion

The most important religious monument in Gietrzwałd is the Shrine of Virgin Mary and the Stations of the Cross located near the forest. There is also a rosary alley leading to the associated spring, the Chapel of the apparitions and the picture of Virgin Mary. This chapel is the most famous of the local chapels which are a distinctive  element of the Warmian landscape.

Education

Schools in Gietrzwałd:
 Andrzej Samulowski Primary School
 Priest W. Zink  Middle School.

Transport

Buses run from Olsztyn and Ostróda to the village. It is also connected to Olsztyn by National Road 16.

References

Villages in Olsztyn County
Marian apparitions